Richvalley is an unincorporated community in Noble Township, Wabash County, in the U.S. state of Indiana.

History
Richvalley was first settled in 1827. An old variant name of the community was called Keller's Station.

A post office was established at Richvalley in 1861, and remained in operation until it was discontinued in 1974.

Geography

References

Unincorporated communities in Wabash County, Indiana
Unincorporated communities in Indiana